Rifle is a home rule municipality in and the most populous community of Garfield County, Colorado, United States. The population was 10,437 at the 2020 census. Rifle is a regional center of the cattle ranching industry located along Interstate 70 and the Colorado River just east of the Roan Plateau, which dominates the western skyline of the town. The town was founded in 1882 by Abram Maxfield, and was incorporated in 1905 along Rifle Creek, near its mouth on the Colorado. The community takes its name from the creek.

History 
The land that Rifle resides on was once in the heart of the Ute Nation, a classification of the Indigenous peoples of the Great Basin. The most common tribe in the area were the Tabagauche, who hunted and lived on the land slightly to the east of Rifle in the Roaring Fork Valley. Due to their location, the Tabagauche were somewhat less exposed to white settlers, and to some extent their ways remained less altered than other native peoples. In 1878 Nathan Meeker was appointed as the director of the White River Ute Agency (the town of Meeker 40 miles north of Rifle was named after him). Meeker had no training or knowledge of Ute culture, and launched into a campaign centered on sedentary agriculture and European-American schooling. As this clashed with the culture of the nomadic Utes, he was met with resistance. It all came to a head when Meeker had the pasture and racetrack for the Ute's horses plowed under. The event that followed is known as the Meeker Massacre in 1879, during which Meeker and his 10 employees were killed. The aftermath of the conflict resulted in nearly all members of the Ute nation being forcibly removed from Colorado into eastern Utah, although the federal government had formerly guaranteed them the land on which they were residing.

Rifle became more and more settled as the 19th century gave way to the 20th. In 1889, the railroad cut through from the east and ended in Rifle for a while before connecting lines were completed. This opened up the floodgates for new travelers, settlers, and trade. Long drives of cattle over the mountains towards the Front Range and Denver became a thing of the past. Rifle was now a thriving hub for commerce. If it needed to be shipped east to a buyer's market, or shipped west into ranching country, it came through town.

The first major economy known to Rifle was ranching. The land surrounding the town was arid, and much of it was unsuitable for farming without irrigation. Despite the large stretches of land available, tension arose and manifested between those who tended cattle and those who herded sheep. Good grazing practices were not in place, and the summer pastures at the top of the Roan Plateau were contested over. One rancher lost two-thirds of his flock and went bankrupt when competing cowboys drove the sheep over the cliff.

Rifle is located in the east portion of the Piceance Basin. The basin is home to different forms of fossil fuels, the largest quantity of which is oil shale. The unreliability of this fossil fuel has left the city in the throes of a cycling boom and bust economy.

, an organization called the Campaign to Save Roan Plateau has been engaged in an effort to minimize oil and gas drilling on the top of the Roan Plateau, which locals call the Bookcliffs.

Geography
Rifle is located in the valley of the Colorado River where Rifle Creek joins from the north. Most of the city is on the north side of the river, but there is some city land to the south. Interstate 70 passes through the city along the south side of the river, with access from Exit 90. I-70 leads east  to Glenwood Springs, the Garfield County seat, and southwest  to Grand Junction. U.S. Route 6 runs along the north side of the Colorado River through Rifle, providing a local parallel route to I-70. Colorado State Highway 13 intersects I-70 and US-6, passing through the southern and western parts of Rifle, then leading north  to Meeker.

Climate

Demographics

As of the census of 2010, there were 9,172 people, 3,221 households, and 2,230 families residing in the city. The racial makeup of the city was 81.0% White, 0.5% African American, 1.3% Native American, 0.6% Asian, 0.1% Pacific Islander, 13.4% from other races, and 3.1% from two or more races. Hispanic or Latino of any race were 30.4% of the population.

There were 3,221 households, out of which 40% had children under the age of 18 living with them, 30.8% were married couples living together, 10.1% had a female householder with no husband present, and 30.8% were non-families. 23.5% of all households were made up of individuals, and 7.1% had someone living alone who was 65 years of age or older.  The average household size was 2.81 and the average family size was 3.35.

In the city, the population was spread out, with 30.6% under the age of 18, 9.2% from 18 to 24, 34.4% from 25 to 44, 17.1% from 45 to 64, and 8.5% who were 65 years of age or older.  The median age was 31 years. For every 100 females, there were 106.1 males.  For every 100 females age 18 and over, there were 105.7 males.

The median income for a household in the city was $42,734, and the median income for a family was $48,714. Males had a median income of $36,517 versus $25,527 for females. The per capita income for the city was $17,376.  About 3.4% of families and 6.4% of the population were below the poverty line, including 7.8% of those under age 18 and 9.8% of those age 65 or over.

Tourism and attractions

It is popular with rock climbers. Other outside attractions near the city include Rifle Falls State Park, Rifle Falls Fish Hatchery, Rifle Gap State Park, Harvey Gap State Park, and access to BLM land, including Hubbard Mesa Open Area, Rifle Arch, and the Roan Plateau.

 north of the center of the city is Rifle Creek Golf Course.

in 2014, the New Ute theater was opened in downtown Rifle.

Rifle is home to the Garfield County Fair Grounds. One week out of the year, the city bustles with activities surrounding family and professional rodeos, Xtreme bull riding, live music, and a demolition derby.

Transportation
The city is served by Garfield County Regional Airport. The state-run bus service Bustang connects Rifle to Grand Junction and Denver. The city is also served by the Union Pacific/Rio Grande line between Denver and Ogden.

Education
It is within Garfield Re-2 School District.

In popular culture
The completed curtain hung for only 28 hours before it was ripped by a gust of wind.

A portion of the film Vanishing Point was filmed in Rifle. Scenes include a shot of Kowalski's car crossing Rifle Bridge, and confronting Utah state patrol cars.

Rifle is also mentioned in Stephen King's The Stand.

Notable people
 David Bernhardt, former Secretary of the Interior
 Lauren Boebert, U.S. Representative
 Bo Nickal, freestyle wrestler and mixed martial artist

References

External links

 City of Rifle official website
 CDOT map of the Town of Rifle
 Citizen Telegram, local newspaper
 Rifle Area Chamber of Commerce

Cities in Garfield County, Colorado
Cities in Colorado
Climbing areas of Colorado
Populated places established in 1882
1882 establishments in Colorado
1895 establishments in Colorado